Montecorvino may refer to:

Localities
Montecorvino Pugliano, Italian municipality of the province of Salerno
Montecorvino Rovella, Italian municipality of the province of Salerno
Motta Montecorvino, Italian municipality of the province of Foggia
Pietramontecorvino, Italian municipality of the province of Foggia

Personalities
John of Montecorvino, Italian franciscan missionary

Religion
Montecorvino (titular see), Italian Roman Catholic titular see
Roman Catholic Diocese of Montecorvino, suppressed Italian Roman Catholic diocese